Safi Nyembo (born September 23, 1984) is a Congolese-born German footballer who plays as a forward.

Biography 
Safi Nyembo was born on September 23, 1984 in Kinshasa, Zaire.

Nyembo began her career with the FSV Schierstein and moved from the U-16 in the summer of 2001 in the Oberliga to SG Germania Wiesbaden. For the 2004/2005 season, she moved to local rivals FFC Frankfurt and announced on December 5, 2004 her Bundesliga debut. After playing one game, she moved to city rivals FSV Frankfurt where she got opportunities to play in 22 games. In 2006, she returned to FFC Frankfurt and played in their second team. After a season in the 2nd Bundesliga, she remained in the reserve of the 1st FFC Frankfurt team. Nyembo decided to transfer to the 1st FC Lokomotive Leipzig. She quickly became a star with the team, scoring 35 goals in 79 games in five years. In March 2012, Nyembo was suspended after a criticism of the board, and since then plays only in the second team. After five years in Leipzig she played till June 2012 before changing to the Bundesliga newly promoted VfL Sindelfingen team. After a successful trial she decided the transfer to FF USV Jena, where she signed a two year contract. In the summer of 2013 she broke her contract, which would have run until 30 June 2014, in Jena and joined the newly founded FFV Leipzig, the successor organization of the women's teams of FC Lokomotive Leipzig. After the withdrawal of the FFV Leipzig from the Regionalliga 2016/2017, she joined the newly founded club FC Phoenix.

References

External links
 Safi Nyembo at fussballdaten.de
 Safi Nyembo at soccerdonna.de

Democratic Republic of the Congo female athletes
German women's footballers
Women's association football forwards
German footballers needing infoboxes
1984 births
Living people
Footballers from Kinshasa